Caterina De Simone, known as Titti De Simone (born 15 February 1970) is an Italian politician and was a member of the  Chamber of Deputies in the 14th and 15th parliaments from 2001 to 2008 for the Communist Refoundation Party (Rifondazione Comunista). When elected in 2001 she was the first openly lesbian member of the Chamber of Deputies.

She was born in Palermo, Sicily.  She has a diploma from an istituto tecnico per il turismo and is a journalist. In July 2019 she entered into a civil union with Francesca (Chicca) Vitucci.

References

1970 births
Living people
20th-century Italian women politicians
21st-century Italian women politicians
Communist Refoundation Party politicians
Deputies of Legislature XIV of Italy
Deputies of Legislature XV of Italy
Lesbian politicians
Politicians from Palermo
Lesbian journalists
LGBT legislators in Italy
Italian LGBT rights activists
Italian LGBT journalists
Italian lesbians
20th-century Italian LGBT people
21st-century Italian LGBT people
Women members of the Chamber of Deputies (Italy)